This list of prehistoric annelids is an attempt to create a comprehensive listing of all genera that have ever been included in Annelida which have been found preserved as fossils. This list excludes purely vernacular terms. It includes all commonly accepted genera, but also genera that are now considered invalid, doubtful (nomina dubia), or were not formally published (nomina nuda), as well as junior synonyms of more established names, and genera that are no longer considered acanthodians.

Naming conventions and terminology
Naming conventions and terminology follow the International Code of Zoological Nomenclature. Technical terms used include:
 Junior synonym: A name which describes the same taxon as a previously published name. If two or more genera are formally designated and the type specimens are later assigned to the same genus, the first to be published (in chronological order) is the senior synonym, and all other instances are junior synonyms. Senior synonyms are generally used, except by special decision of the ICZN, but junior synonyms cannot be used again, even if deprecated. Junior synonymy is often subjective, unless the genera described were both based on the same type specimen.
 Nomen nudum (Latin for "naked name"): A name that has appeared in print but has not yet been formally published by the standards of the ICZN. Nomina nuda (the plural form) are invalid, and are therefore not italicized as a proper generic name would be. If the name is later formally published, that name is no longer a nomen nudum and will be italicized on this list. Often, the formally published name will differ from any nomina nuda that describe the same specimen.
 Nomen oblitum (Latin for "forgotten name"): A name that has not been used in the scientific community for more than fifty years after its original proposal.
 Preoccupied name: A name that is formally published, but which has already been used for another taxon. This second use is invalid (as are all subsequent uses) and the name must be replaced. As preoccupied names are not valid generic names, they will also go unitalicized on this list.
 Nomen dubium (Latin for "dubious name"): A name describing a fossil with no unique diagnostic features. As this can be an extremely subjective and controversial designation, this term is not used on this list.

A

 Aglaurides
 Albertaprion
 Amphictene
 Anisocerasites
 Arabella
 Arabellites
 Archaeoprion
 Archarenicola
 Arenicola
 Arites
 Asterosalpinx
 Astreptoscolex

B

 Biconulites
 Bipygmaeus
 Bohemoscolex
 Brochosogenys
 Bundenbachochaeta
 Burgessochaeta

C

 Camptosalpinx
 Campylites
 Canadia
 Carbosesostris
 Cementula
 Chaetosalpinx
 Circeis
 Clavulites
 Conora
 Cowiella
 Crininicaminus
 Cryptosiphon
 Ctenoscolex
 Cubiculovinea
 Cycloserpula

D

 Delosites
 Didontogaster
 Dinoscolites
 Diopatraites
 Diploconcha
 Discouvermetulus
 Ditrupa
 Ditrupula
 Dodecaceria
 Dorvillea
 Drilonereis
 Dryptoscolex

E

 Ebetallites
 Elleriprion
 Eopolychaetus
 Eotomopteris
 Eotrophonia
 Epitrachys
 Esconites
 Eunice
 Eunicites
 Euryprion

F

 Falkosites
 Fastuoscolex
 Filograna
 Filogranula
 flabelligerid
 Flucticularia
 Fossundecima

G

 Galeolaria
 Gammascolex
 Gitonia
 Glycera
 Goniada
 Gotlandites

H

 Hadimopanella
 Hadoprion
 Haileyia
 Halla
 Hammatopsis
 Hamulus
 Hesionites
 Hicetes
 Hindenites
 Hindeoprion
 Hirudopsis
 Homaphrodites
 Houscolex
 Howellitubus
 Hydroides
 Hystriciola

I

 Ildraites
 Insolicorypha
 Iquitosia

J

 Janita
 Jereminella
 Josephella

K

 Kaimenella
 Kalloprion
 Kettnerites
 Khemisina
 Klakesia

L

 Lanceolatites
 Langeites
 Laqueoserpula
 Lecathylus
 Lepidenteron
 Lercaritubus
 Levisettius
 Lockportia
 Longitubus
 Lumbriconereis
 Lumbricopsis
 Lysaretides

M

 Maeandropolydora
 Marlenites
 Marphysaites
 Melanoraphia
 Mercierella
 Meringosoma
 Metalaeospira
 Metavermilia
 Microdactylophora
 Microtubus
 Milaculum
 Mochtyella
 Multiprion
 Muroserpula
 Myzostomites

N

 Nawnites
 Neodexiospira
 Neomicrorbis
 Neovermilia
 Nereidavus
 Nothrites
 Notocirrus

O

 Oblongiprion
 Oenonites
 Oliveirania
 Onuphis
 Ophryotrocha
 Ornatoporta
 Orthoconorca
 Orthopelta
 Ottawella
 Ottawina
 Oxyprion

P

 Palaeoaphrodite
 Palaeochaeta
 Palaeodactylophora
 Palaeopelyx
 Palaeoscolecida
 Palaeoscolex
 Paleonereites
 Paleononites
 Paliurus
 Palurites
 Paradrilonereigenys
 Paraglycerites
 Paragnathites
 Paralaeospira
 Paranereites
 Paraterebella
 Parsimonia
 Pectinaria
 Pegmaticula
 Pentaditrupa
 Pernerites
 Peronochaeta
 Phiops
 Phragmosalpinx
 Pieckonia
 Pileolaria
 Pistoprion
 Placostegus
 Plasmuscolex
 Polychaetaspis
 Polydora
 Pomatoceros
 Pontobdellopsis
 Praeglycera
 Praelumbrinereis
 Processoprion
 Pronereites
 Propolynoe
 Propomatoceros
 Protarabellites
 Protectoconorca
 Proterebella
 Proterula
 Protonympha
 Protoscolex
 Protula
 Protulites
 Protulophila
 Psammosiphon
 Pteropelta
 Pyrgopolon

R

 Ramesses
 Ramphoprion
 Raphidiophorus
 Rhamphegenys
 Rhytiprion
 Rotularia
 Ruedemannella
 Rutellifrons

S

 Sabellaria
 Salmacina
 Sarcinella
 Sarcionata
 Schistomeringos
 Schizoproboscina
 Sciotoprion
 Sclerostyla
 Scolecoderma
 Semiserpula
 Serpentula
 Serpula
 Serpularia
 Serpulopsis
 Sinuocornu
 Siphonostomites
 Skalenoprion
 Soris
 Spiraserpula
 Spirographites
 Spirorbis
 Staurocephalites
 Stauronereisites
 Stephenoscolex
 Sthenelaites
 Stoma
 Streblosoma
 Streptindytes
 Symmetroprion

T

 Terebella
 Terebellites
 Terebellolites
 Tetraprion
 Tetraserpula
 Thalenessites
 Titahia
 Torlessia
 Tosalorbis
 Trentonia
 Triadonereis
 Trianguligenys
 Tubulelloides
 Turbinia

U

 Uncinogenys
 Ungulites

V

 Vepreculina
 Vermilia
 Vermiliopsis

X
 Xanioprion

References 

 List of